Selo pri Vodicah is a small settlement in the Municipality of Vodice, just north of Ljubljana, in the Upper Carniola region of Slovenia. It lies in the northeast part of the Skaručna Basin.

Name
The name of the settlement was changed from Selo to Selo pri Vodicah in 1953.

References

External links
Selo pri Vodicah on Geopedia

Populated places in the Municipality of Vodice